Yolly Roberson is a Miami, Florida attorney and Democratic politician who serves as the representative for District 104 of the Florida House of Representatives. She was first elected to the Florida House in 2002 and then reelected successively to three more terms. She served as Democratic Whip from 2004 to 2006.

Representative Roberson was born in  Mirebalais, Haiti on October 26, 1955. She earned her Bachelor of Science in Nursing at the University of Massachusetts Boston in 1983 and her Juris Doctor at the New England School of Law in 1988. She has worked as a public defender in Boston and as a senior assistant attorney general in Fort Lauderdale, Florida.

See also
United States House of Representatives elections in Florida, 2010#District 17

References

External links
Representative Yolly Roberson official Florida House of Representatives site
Yolly Roberson for U.S. Congress official campaign site
 

Democratic Party members of the Florida House of Representatives
1955 births
Living people
Women state legislators in Florida
University of Massachusetts Boston alumni
New England Law Boston alumni
Haitian emigrants to the United States
American politicians of Haitian descent
Public defenders
21st-century American women